The Dilettante is a 1999 French comedy film directed by Pascal Thomas and starring Catherine Frot, Sébastien Cotterot and Barbara Schulz. The film was entered into the 21st Moscow International Film Festival where Catherine Frot won the Silver St. George for Best Actress.

Cast
 Catherine Frot - Pierrette Dumortier
 Sébastien Cotterot - Éric
 Barbara Schulz - Nathalie
 Jacques Dacqmine - Delaunay
 Christian Morin - Edmond Rambert
 Jean Desailly - Edmond Thibault
 Armelle - The Judge
 Jean-François Balmer - Président of the tribunal
 Marie-Christine Barrault - Thérèse Rambert
 Didier Bezace - Father Ferro
 Gisèle Casadesus - The volunteer
 Odette Laure - Zoé de la Tresmondière
 Bernard Verley - André Ackerman
 Michèle Garcia - The college manager
 Sophie Mounicot - Gym teacher
 Gérard Hernandez - Police Inspector

References

External links

1999 films
1999 comedy films
1990s French-language films
Films directed by Pascal Thomas
French comedy films
1990s French films